Nanci Pierce Kincaid (born September 5, 1950) is an American novelist who wrote a short story collection titled Pretending the Bed Is a Raft (1997), as well as novels Crossing Blood (1991), Balls (1999), Verbena (2002), and As Hot As It Was You Ought to Thank Me (2005). The film My Life Without Me was based on the title story in Pretending the Bed Is a Raft. The story's plot is very similar to No Sad Songs for Me, novel written by Ruth Southard (New York, 1944). Her most recent novel is "Eat, Drink, and be from Mississippi" (Little, Brown, 2009).

Early life and education
Born Nanci Pierce in Tallahassee, Florida, Kincaid grew up in Richmond, Virginia and graduated from Huguenot High School in 1968. After attending Virginia Tech and the University of Wyoming, Kincaid completed her B.A. at Athens State College (now Athens State University) in 1987. In 1991, Kincaid completed a Master of Fine Arts degree at the University of Alabama.

Personal life
She was previously married to former University of Wyoming and Arkansas State University football coach Al Kincaid. In 1997, Kincaid married college football coach Dick Tomey; their marriage lasted until Tomey's death in 2019. They had four children and five grandchildren. With Tomey, Kincaid lived in Honolulu, Hawaii; Tucson, Arizona; and San Jose, California.

References 

1950 births
Living people
20th-century American novelists
20th-century American women writers
21st-century American novelists
21st-century American women writers
American women short story writers
American women novelists
Athens State University alumni
Writers from Richmond, Virginia
Writers from San Diego
Writers from San Jose, California
Writers from Tallahassee, Florida
Writers from Honolulu
20th-century American short story writers
21st-century American short story writers
Novelists from Alabama
Novelists from California
Novelists from Florida
Novelists from Hawaii
Novelists from Virginia
University of Alabama alumni
Virginia Tech alumni
University of Wyoming alumni